The Girl from Plainville is an American true crime drama miniseries created by Liz Hannah and Patrick Macmanus. The series stars Elle Fanning, Chloë Sevigny, and Colton Ryan. It premiered on Hulu on March 29, 2022. A portion of the series showed at SXSW on March 12, 2022. The series is a dramatization of the events leading to the death of Conrad Roy and his girlfriend Michelle Carter's conviction for involuntary manslaughter. The series received mostly positive reviews, with praise going towards the performances of Fanning, Ryan and Sevigny.

Premise
The Girl from Plainville explores the events leading to the death of Conrad Roy and his girlfriend Michelle Carter's conviction for involuntary manslaughter.

Cast

Main

 Elle Fanning as Michelle Carter
 Chloë Sevigny as Lynn Roy
 Cara Buono as Gail Carter
 Kai Lennox as David Carter
 Colton Ryan as Conrad "Coco" Roy III
 Norbert Leo Butz as Conrad "Co" Roy II

Recurring

 Kelly AuCoin as Scott Gordon
 Scott William Winters as Eric Dawicki
 Kristin Griffith as Janice Roy
 Ella Rubin as Natalie Gibson	
 Jeff Wahlberg as Rob Mahoney
 Kylie Liya Page as Cassie Wilkins
 Peter Gerety as Conrad Roy, Sr.
 Chinasa Ogbuagu as Teresa Adams
 Pearl Amanda Dickson as Susie Pierce
Aya Cash as Katie Rayburn
 Michael Mosley as Joseph Cataldo
In addition, Ella Kennedy Davis co-stars as Sydney Roy, one of Coco's younger sisters.

Episodes

Production

Development
On August 15, 2019, it was announced that Universal Content Productions was developing a television series inspired by the case, with documentarian Erin Lee Carr and journalist Jesse Barron serving as consulting producers. On August 7, 2020, it was reported that series was given a straight-to-series order and the series would be titled The Girl From Plainville which would be on Hulu. The series is created by Liz Hannah and Patrick Macmanus who are also expected to executive produce alongside Elle Fanning and Brittany Kahan Ward. Universal Content Productions, Echo Lake Entertainment, and Littleton Road Productions are the production companies involved with producing the series. On April 14, 2021, it was announced that Lisa Cholodenko is set to direct the first two episodes of the series. On September 2, 2021, it was reported that Hannah, Zetna Fuentes, and Pippa Bianco were added as directors for the limited series. The series was released on March 29, 2022.

The series is scheduled to release on StarzPlay in UK, Austria, Belgium, Denmark, Finland, France, Germany, Iceland, Ireland, Italy, Luxembourg, the Netherlands, Norway, Spain, Sweden, Switzerland, Japan, and Latin America, including Brazil and Mexico.

Filming for the series began on August 17, 2021, and concluded on December 10, 2021, in Savannah, Georgia.

Casting
Upon the series order announcement, it was reported that Elle Fanning was cast to star. On May 6, 2021, it was announced that Colton Ryan joined that cast on a starring role. In August 2021, it was reported that Chloë Sevigny, Norbert Leo Butz, Cara Buono, and Kai Lennox were cast as series regulars. On October 1, 2021, it was announced that Peter Gerety, Michael Mosley, Ella Kennedy Davis, Pearl Amanda Dickson, Kylie Liya Page, and Jeff Wahlberg joined the cast in recurring roles.

Reception

Critical response
The Girl from Plainville received mostly positive reviews from critics. The review aggregator website Rotten Tomatoes reported a 93% approval rating based on 29 critic reviews, with an average rating of 7.2/10. The website's critics consensus reads, "Grounded by a disturbingly powerful performance by Elle Fanning, The Girl from Plainville dramatizes a sordid true story with tasteful restraint." On Metacritic, the limited series has a score of 76 out of 100, based on 18 reviews, indicating "generally favorable reviews."

Saloni Gajjar The A.V. Club gave the limited series a B- and said, "it succeeds in bringing a humane element to a puzzling crime without sensationalizing it. And for the most part, this is because of rousing performances by Fanning, Ryan, and Chloë Sevigny..."

Awards and nominations

References

External links
 

2020s American drama television miniseries
2022 American television series debuts
2022 American television series endings
American television miniseries
English-language television shows
Hulu original programming
Suicide in television
Television series by Universal Content Productions
Television series set in the 2010s
Television shows filmed in Georgia (U.S. state)
Television shows set in Massachusetts
True crime television series